Felix Christiadi Sutanto (born December 24, 1975 in Surabaya) is a retired Indonesian swimmer, who specialized in individual medley events. He represented Indonesia, along with his twin brother Albert, at the 2000 Summer Olympics, and later received a total of sixteen All-American titles at the NAIA Men's Swimming and Diving Championships, while studying in the United States. Because of his tremendous career in college swimming, Sutanto was named the 2002 and 2003 Most Outstanding Male Swimmer of the Year by the National Association of Intercollegiate Athletics (NAIA).

Sutanto accepted an athletic scholarship to attend the California Baptist University in Riverside, California, where he majored in business administration, and played for the California Baptist Lancers swimming and diving team under head coach Rick Rowland. While swimming for the Lancers, Sutanto received sixteen All-American titles, and held three meet records in the 100-yard backstroke, 200-yard backstroke, and 200-yard individual medley at the NAIA Men's Swimming and Diving Championships. He was also named the 2002 and 2003 NAIA's Most Outstanding Male Swimmer of the Year, before graduating from the University in the spring of 2004.

A member of the Indonesian squad, Sutanto competed only in the men's 200 m individual medley at the 2000 Summer Olympics in Sydney. He achieved a FINA B-cut of 2:08.84 from the Asian Swimming Championships in Busan, South Korea. He challenged seven other swimmers in heat one, including Kuwait's four-time Olympian Sultan Al-Otaibi. Entering the Games with a top-seeded time, Sutanto enjoyed a powerful lead in the first three lengths, but fell short on the freestyle leg to register a fourth-place finish in 2:09.77, almost a 1.9-second deficit from winner Andrei Pakin of Kyrgyzstan. Sutanto failed to advance into the semifinals, as he placed fiftieth overall in the prelims.

Five years later, at the 2005 Southeast Asian Games in Manila, Sutanto helped his teammates Herry Yudhianto, legend Richard Sam Bera, and his twin brother Albert capture a medley relay title in a time of 3:51.51.

References

1975 births
Living people
Indonesian people of Chinese descent
Indonesian male swimmers
Olympic swimmers of Indonesia
Swimmers at the 2000 Summer Olympics
Male medley swimmers
California Baptist Lancers men's swimmers
Sportspeople from Surabaya
Southeast Asian Games medalists in swimming
Southeast Asian Games gold medalists for Indonesia
Southeast Asian Games silver medalists for Indonesia
Swimmers at the 1994 Asian Games
Competitors at the 2005 Southeast Asian Games
Asian Games competitors for Indonesia
20th-century Indonesian people
21st-century Indonesian people